was the lead ship of her class of destroyer in the Imperial Japanese Navy.

Design and description
The Akizuki-class ships were originally designed as anti-aircraft escorts for carrier battle groups, but were modified with torpedo tubes and depth charges to meet the need for more general-purpose destroyers. Her crew numbered 300 officers and enlisted men.

The ship had two Kampon geared steam turbines, each driving one propeller shaft, using steam provided by three Kampon water-tube boilers.

The main armament of the Akizuki class consisted of eight Type 98  dual purpose guns in four twin-gun turrets, two superfiring pairs fore and aft of the superstructure. They carried four Type 96  anti-aircraft guns in two twin-gun mounts. The ships were also armed with four  torpedo tubes in a single quadruple traversing mount; one reload was carried for each tube. Their anti-submarine weapons comprised six depth charge throwers for which 72 depth charges were carried.

Construction and career
Akizuki was completed on 11 June 1942. She participated in the Battle of the Eastern Solomons on 24 August 1942 and sustained no damage. She participated in the Guadalcanal Campaign as well, helping to guard transports before sustaining a bomb hit and several near misses on October 25 which killed 11 and injured 22 of her crew, and slowed her to 23 knots. She returned to Japan and was repaired from 8 November to 16 December 1942. On 19 January 1943, she was torpedoed by USS Nautilus, which flooded a boiler room and her starboard engine room, killing 14 and injuring 64. She was able to steam at 20 knots, and had to resort to emergency steering. She returned to Truk and had to spend from February 2 to 11 March alongside the repair ship Akashi. As she was preparing to return to Japan, however, her bow started sagging and, fearing it was about to break off, she had to be beached at Saipan. She was cut in half and the bridge and forward turrets were removed to lighten ship and replaced with a temporary "wave-cutter" bow. A temporary bridge was constructed behind the mainmast. She was repaired from July to October, receiving the bow from her incomplete sister ship, Shimotsuki. She participated in the Battle of the Philippine Sea, helping rescue survivors from Taiho and help protect Zuikaku from air attack.

In October 1944 Akizuki was part of the Northern Force commanded by Vice Admiral Jisaburo Ozawa, in the Japanese attack on the Allied forces supporting the invasion of Leyte. On 25 October, in the Battle off Cape Engaño, the ship was sunk, probably by torpedo, east-northeast of Cape Engaño, during the initial U.S. air attack on the Northern Force. Most sources credit the hit to aircraft of Task Force 38, but some give credit to the submarine .

Notes

References

External links
 Combinedfleet.com Akizuki TROM
 CombinedFleet.com: Akizuki-class destroyers

Akizuki-class destroyers (1942)
Shipwrecks in the Philippine Sea
World War II destroyers of Japan
1941 ships
Maritime incidents in October 1944